Van Hiles (born November 1, 1975) is a former American football defensive back. He played for the Chicago Bears in 1997.

References

1975 births
Living people
American football defensive backs
Kentucky Wildcats football players
Chicago Bears players
Players of American football from Baton Rouge, Louisiana
Brian Piccolo Award winners